The Catskill and Tannersville Railway was a historic  narrow gauge railroad operating in New York.

Also known as "The Huckleberry", the C&T operated tracks that were laid to a  narrow gauge. The C&T faced competition from the parallel Stony Clove and Kaaterskill branch of the Ulster and Delaware Railroad.

History
The Catskill Mountain Railway didn't always have the Catskill & Tannersville to connect the Otis Elevating Railway to Tannersville. Instead, the Kaaterskill Railroad served that purpose, as it was the same  narrow gauge as the Otis Elevating and the Catskill Mountain Railway, and connected by a shorter C&T from the Otis Summit Station, too. But the C&T was also present in the area, and was very close to the Kaaterskill. In fact, the two lines were so close that the C&T ran trains on the KRR from 1893-1898. So the CMR president solved that problem by lengthening the C&T to Tannersville in 1899.

It was built on a tight budget, and used  narrow gauge track so it could interchange freight cars with the Otis, and because it was cheaper. It only had two locomotives in its roster, both eventually being replaced by outside-frame engines. This railroad was the Ulster & Delaware's narrow gauge competitor; it did offer an alternative route, but this "alternative route" was right next to the U&D, and most of the C&T stations were right across from the U&D stations. There were downfalls to using this railroad, and that included the fact that the railroad barely ever ran on time. This was probably due to the frequent stops to let passengers get out and see the Kaaterskill Falls, the mountain laurel in full bloom, and even to pick blueberries, which the locals called "huckleberries", hence the railroad's nickname, and was probably enjoyed by the fellow passengers.

The railroad was somewhat profitable, and managed to survive for quite a while, but it couldn't stave off bankruptcy. It went bankrupt in 1918, and was torn up and sold for scrap, along with the rest of the Catskill Mountain Railway system in 1919. The two locomotives that were previously owned by the C&T were shipped to the Bellevue and Cascade Railroad in the State of Iowa.

Stations
 Tannersville Station
 Clum Road Station
 The Antlers Hotel
 Haines Falls Station
 Laurel House Station
 Otis Summit Station

Locomotives

Rolling stock

Freight Car Interchange

In 1904, a freight car interchange was installed between the C.&T. Ry. and the Otis Ry. at Otis Summit. The Catskill Mountain Ry. built the following freight cars for use through this interchange, and through the interchange with the C.M. Ry. at the foot of the Otis Ry.

References
 A. 
 B. Ulster and Delaware Railroad Historical Society
 C.

External links
 Catskill Mountain System
 Ulster and Delaware Railroad Historical Society
 A history of the Town of Hunter
 Old C+T Railway Cache (Geocaching)

Defunct New York (state) railroads
3 ft gauge railways in the United States
Narrow gauge railroads in New York (state)
Catskills
Railway companies established in 1893
Railway companies disestablished in 1919
Transportation in Greene County, New York